Your Vandal is an EP by the Northern Ireland based artist Duke Special. The record was released on Hag Records in 2005, and features seven tracks.

Track listing
"Worst at the Best of Times" - 3:48
"Portrait" - 3:05
"John Lennon Love" - 3:31
"...genie lamp..." - 0:46
"Low" - 3:19
"Your Vandal" - 2:49
"...oak tree..." - 1:05

All songs were written by Duke Special, with the exception of "Worst at the Best of Times" (by Duke Special and Iain Archer), and "Your Vandal" (by Phil Wilkinson).

2005 EPs
Duke Special albums